The MIT News is an official publication of the Massachusetts Institute of Technology. , it includes a web site, a daily newsletter, the MIT Daily, and a weekly newsletter, the MIT Weekly. It is edited by the MIT News Office. It started publication in September 1994.

See also
 MIT Tech Talk, MIT weekly official newspaper from 1957 to 2009

External links
 Official site

Notes

Massachusetts Institute of Technology publications